This list of museums in Baltimore encompasses museums, defined for this context as institutions (including nonprofit organizations, government entities, and private businesses) that collect and care for objects of cultural, artistic, scientific, or historical interest and make their collections or related exhibits available for public viewing. Museums that exist only in cyberspace (i.e., virtual museums) are not included.

Museums

Defunct museums 
 American Dime Museum - museum of curiosities, closed in 2006
 Antique Toy Museum, Baltimore - closed in 2012
 B. Olive Cole Pharmacy Museum - was located in the Kelly building at the Maryland Pharmacists Association
 Baltimore City Life Museums - consortium of historic homes, building and sites (folded 1997)
 Baltimore Public Works Museum in the old Eastern Avenue Sewage Pumping Station of 1910 on the east bank of the Jones Falls by Pier 6 and Harbor East area, in the Inner Harbor - closed temporarily in 2010 by the City D.P.W.
 Contemporary Museum on West Centre Street and Park Avenue in the Mount Vernon-Belvedere neighborhood on Cathedral Hill - closed in 2012
 Fells Point Maritime Museum on Thames Street in the Fells Point waterfront community, opened 2004 by the Maryland Historical Society to exhibit its George Radcliffe Maritime Collection extensive but previously hidden in the basement level of the Md.H.S. Monument Street galleries - closed in 2007 with collections returned to Monument Street in Mount Vernon-Belvedere.
 Geppi's Entertainment Museum on the second floor of Camden Street Station - closed in 2018
 Mount Vernon Museum of Incandescent Lighting - Closed 2002, collection now at Baltimore Museum of Industry on Francis Scott Key Highway near Federal Hill.
 Museum of Baltimore Legal History - established 1990s in former Orphans Court chambers at the 1896-1900 Clarence Mitchell Baltimore City Courthouse between North Calvert and Saint Paul Streets - open for Courthouse visitors intermittently - historical artifacts/exhibits of Baltimore’s Bench and Bar, managed by the Baltimore Courthouse and Law Museum Foundation
 National Pinball Museum - closed 2013, collection sold off in March 2014
 Sports Legends Museum at Camden Yards, located inside historic Camden Street Station of 1857-1865 for the old Baltimore and Ohio Railroad as their main terminal and headquarters. Renovated/restored exterior in 1992 as part of adjacent Camden Yards sports complex of stadiums - Opened 2005 as sports museum for Maryland by the nearby Babe Ruth Birthplace and Museum on Emory Street - closed in 2015

Gallery

See also 
 List of museums in Maryland

References

Museums in Baltimore

Maryland culture

Baltimore
Museums
Museums in Baltimore
Tourist attractions in Baltimore